112 is the debut album from the American R&B group 112. It was released on August 27, 1996, as one of the first R&B records on Sean Combs' Bad Boy label. The majority of the album was produced primarily by Combs, Tim & Bob and one of the first Hitmen, Stevie J. It also included contributions from group member Daron Jones, Al B Sure!, Kyle West, Arnold Hennings and Boyz II Men vocalist Wanya Morris. The album features label mates the late The Notorious B.I.G., Mase and Faith Evans. Three singles were released from the album: "Only You", "Come See Me" and "Cupid". All of the singles had music videos released.

Background 
Originally known as Forte while in high school and still in their teens, the quartet enlisted the professional management services of Courtney Sills and Kevin Wales. Named after the Atlanta-based club 112, the group performed there in front of singers Faith Evans and Usher along with Bad Boy founder Sean Combs. After their performance, the group became the second R&B act signed to Bad Boy behind Faith Evans, who – along with producer Chucky Thompson – recommended Combs to sign them.

According to 112 member and producer Daron Jones, the group Boyz II Men was a primary influence on their debut. The reason for their influence was due to them accepting several songs produced by Tim Kelley & Bob Robinson that were initially planned for inclusion on Boyz II Men's second album II. Producer Bob Robinson revealed that Boyz II Men wanted Tim & Bob to produce the majority of II, but Motown Records president Jheryl Busby felt uncomfortable with unknown producers helming a project by a group that was the biggest act in the world at the time. Busby then sought out productions from more established names and as a result, Kelley & Robinson's songs – notably "Now That We're Done" and "Can I Touch You" – were later given to 112 for their album. Jones felt inconfident about his lead vocals while recording "Now That We're Done" and was surprised at the reaction to his performance. Singer Brandy – who was there with the song's co-writer Wanya Morris – caught Jones off-guard when she asked him to teach her how to do the riffs and runs she heard from him.

Producer Stevie J was brought into the project fresh off from his touring with Jodeci and appearing on their 1995 album The Show, The After Party, The Hotel. Stevie served as a mentor to Jones, who expressed a desire to become a songwriter and producer. The first single from 112 - "Only You" - was hated by the group because of the restrained vocals, which they felt wasn't the best song to showcase their singing. According to Jones, they initially wanted "Now That We're Done" released as the first single and the only thing that made them like "Only You" was the remix - which was also included on the album. They quickly dismissed the song and felt it wasn't going to be successful. The song about which they were indifferent became a breakout hit for them.
 
Another single "Cupid" was primarily inspired by Babyface. The group wanted the songwriter/producer to work on their debut, but financial issues and budget constraints prevented him from working on the album. Jones then felt he could write a "Babyface" type of song and later worked with Dallas Austin protégé Arnold Hennings on producing it. Al B. Sure! and Dave Hollister were called in to work on the album as well. While none of Hollister's songs made the final track listing, one of Sure!'s contributions "Erase The Day" was left off while his other contribution "This Is Your Day" was included on the album. The group started recording in February 1995 and finished the album in January 1996.

Critical reception

Leo Stanley of Allmusic gave the album 4 out of 5 stars stating that "as the first romantic soul group on Puff Daddy's Bad Boy label, 112 at least has the appearance of originality. However, their eponymous debut demonstrates that this is only an appearance - in reality, they are much like a Boyz II Men clone. That's not necessarily bad, actually. 112 have strong voices, and their smooth harmonies are quite seductive, making the lack of originality in their music easy to overlook. A little more variety on 112 would have been nice—the album consists almost entirely of ballads—but the group's sound and Puffy's professional production make it a pleasurable record nevertheless."

Track listing 
Songwriting credits and track listing adapted from liner notes.

Notes
 signifies a co-producer

Sample credits
 "Call My Name" contains samples of "Walk On By", written by Burt Bacharach and Hal David, and performed by Isaac Hayes.
 "Only You" contains samples of "I Get Lifted", written by Harry Wayne Casey and Richard Finch, and performed by KC and the Sunshine Band.
 "In Love With You" contains samples of "Blind Alley", written by David Porter, and performed by The Emotions.

Personnel
Adapted from the album's liner notes.

 Al B. Sure! – producer, vocal arranger, engineer, and mixing 
 "Prince" Charles Alexander – mixing 
 Deric Angelettie – additional programming 
 Dan Beroff – assistant engineer 
 Carlos Broady – remixing 
 Mr. Cheeks – rap 
 Sean "Puffy" Combs – producer , co-producer , remixing , executive producer
 Lane Craven – engineer , mixing 
 Stephen Dent – 2nd engineer 
 Bill Esses – engineer 
 Faith Evans – featured vocals 
 Rasheed Goodlowe – 2nd engineer 
 Arnold Hennings – producer 
 Daron Jones – vocals, producer , piano 
 Steven "Stevie J." Jordan – producer , co-producer , remixing 
 Michael Keith – vocals
 Tim Kelley – producer ; engineer ; mixing ; keyboards, drums, and bass 
 Paul Logus – engineer , mixing 
 Chauncey Mahan – engineer 
 Mase – rap 
 Tony Maserati – engineer , mixing 
 Wanya Morris – producer , co-producer 
 Nashiem Myrick – remixing 
 Axel Niehaus – engineer , mixing 
 The Notorious B.I.G. – rap 
 Quinnes "Q" Parker – vocals
 Michael Patterson – engineer , mixing 
 Herb Powers – mastering
 Kelly Price – background vocals 
 Darin Prindle – engineer , mixing 
 Alex Richbourg – producer 
 Bob Robinson – producer , engineer , mixing , acoustic piano and keyboards 
 Marvin Scandrick – vocals
 Kyle West – producer 
 Doug A. Wilson – mixing , 2nd engineer

Charts

Weekly charts

Year-end charts

Certifications

Release history

References 

1996 debut albums
112 (band) albums
Bad Boy Records albums
Albums produced by Sean Combs
Albums produced by Stevie J
Albums produced by Tim & Bob
Albums produced by Wanya Morris
Albums produced by Al B. Sure!
Hip hop soul albums